More Blues and the Abstract Truth is an album by American jazz composer, conductor and arranger Oliver Nelson featuring performances recorded in 1964 for the Impulse! label.

Reception
The Allmusic review by Scott Yanow awarded the album 4 stars, stating: "Unlike the original classic Blues and the Abstract Truth set from three years earlier, Oliver Nelson does not play on this album. He did contribute three of the eight originals and all of the arrangements but his decision not to play is disappointing... The emphasis is on blues-based pieces and there are some strong moments even if the date falls short of its predecessor".

Track listing
All compositions by Oliver Nelson except as noted

 "Blues and the Abstract Truth" - 5:14
 "Blues O'Mighty" (Hodges) - 6:48
 "Theme from Mr. Broadway" (Brubeck) - 5:45
 "Midnight Blue" (Neal Hefti) - 4:06
 "The Critic's Choice" - 2:21
 "One for Bob" - 6:07
 "Blues for Mr. Broadway" (Brubeck) - 8:12
 "Goin' to Chicago Blues" (Count Basie, Jimmy Rushing) - 4:37
 "One for Phil" - 3:58 Bonus track on CD reissue
 "Night Lights" (Arnold Shaw) - 2:46 Bonus track on CD reissue

Recorded on November 10, 1964 (tracks 4 & 6–9), and November 11, 1964 (tracks 1–3, 5 & 10).

Personnel
Oliver Nelson - arranger, conductor
Thad Jones, Danny Moore (tracks 1 & 5) - trumpet
Phil Woods - alto saxophone
Ben Webster - tenor saxophone (tracks 4 & 7)
Phil Bodner - tenor saxophone, English horn
Pepper Adams - baritone saxophone
Roger Kellaway - piano
Richard Davis – bass
Grady Tate – drums

References

Impulse! Records albums
Oliver Nelson albums
1965 albums
Albums recorded at Van Gelder Studio
Albums produced by Bob Thiele
Albums conducted by Oliver Nelson
Albums arranged by Oliver Nelson